These are the results of the November 6, 2005, municipal elections in Quebec for the region of Gaspésie-Îles-de-la-Madeleine. Some mayors and councillors were elected without opposition from October 14, 2005.

Bonaventure
Mayor and councillors 2, 3, 4, 5 and 6 were elected without opposition.
 Mayor: Serge Arsenault
 Councillor 1: Bernard Babin
 Councillor 2: Jean-Claude Cyr
 Councillor 3: Stéphane Cyr
 Councillor 4: Solange Vignola
 Councillor 5: Raymond Pigeon
 Councillor 6: Marcel Arsenault

Cap-Chat
Electors: 2 284
Voters: 1 193 (52%)
Councillors 1 and 4 were elected without opposition.
 Mayor: Judes Landry
 Councillor 1: Richard Émond
 Councillor 2: Donald Pelletier
 Councillor 3: Réjean Bouchard
 Councillor 4: Roland Pouliot
 Councillor 5: Joseph Roland Dumont
 Councillor 6: René Pouliot

Caplan
Electors: 1 664
Voters: 831 (50%)
Councillors 1, 2, 4, 5 and 6 were elected without opposition.
 Mayor: Doris Boissonnault
 Councillor 1: Jean-Guy Morneau
 Councillor 2: Paul-Renaud Poirier
 Councillor 3: Raynald Lepage
 Councillor 4: Donald Doucet
 Councillor 5: Gérard Audet
 Councillor 6: Germain Glazer

Carleton-sur-Mer
Electors: 3 367
Voters: 2 157 (64%)
Councillor 1 was elected without opposition.
 Mayor: Michel Lacroix
 Councillor 1: Normand Parr
 Councillor 2: Donald Falardeau
 Councillor 3: Raymond Deslauriers
 Councillor 4: Rémi Lebreux
 Councillor 5: Normand Lafrance
 Councillor 6: Marie-Christine Lavergne

Cascapédia–Saint-Jules
All elected without opposition.
 Mayor: Pat St-Onge
 Councillor 1: Réal Bujold
 Councillor 2: Susan Sexton
 Councillor 3: Conrad Legouffe
 Councillor 4: Joseph Barter
 Councillor 5: François Blais
 Councillor 6: Reynald Hall

Chandler
Electors: 6 596
Voters: 4 613 (70%)
 Mayor: Claude Cyr
 Councillor 1: Luc Legresley
 Councillor 2: Robert Smith
 Councillor 3: Louisette Langlois
 Councillor 4: Denis Michaud
 Councillor 5: Clermont Duguay
 Councillor 6: Noël Huard

Cloridorme
Electors: 731
Voters: 594 (81%)
Councillors 2 and 6 were elected without opposition.
 Mayor: Jocelyne Huet
 Councillor 1: Ronald Bélanger
 Councillor 2: Gilles Côté
 Councillor 3: Jean-Paul Huet
 Councillor 4: Valère Huet
 Councillor 5: Onil Chicoine
 Councillor 6: Nancy Clavet

Escuminac
Electors: 547
Voters: 367 (67%)
Councillors 2, 4 and 5 were elected without opposition.
 Mayor: Bertrand Berger
 Councillor 1: Bruce Wafer
 Councillor 2: Roger Gallant
 Councillor 3: Richard St-Onge
 Councillor 4: Vital Caissy
 Councillor 5: France Cellard
 Councillor 6: Reinald Gallant

Gaspé
Electors: 12 032
Voters: 6 705 (56%)
Councillor 1 was elected without opposition.
 Mayor: François Roussy
 Councillor 1: Luc Savage
 Councillor 2: Charles Aspirault
 Councillor 3: Nicole Perry Fortin
 Councillor 4: Denis Sinnett
 Councillor 5: Aline Perry
 Councillor 6: Brad McDonald

Grande-Rivière
Electors: 2 903
Voters: 1 980 (68%)
Councillors 3 and 5 were elected without opposition.
 Mayor: Romuald Boutin
 Councillor 1: Bernard Stevens
 Councillor 2: Charles Cyr
 Councillor 3: Didier Moreau
 Councillor 4: Gino Cyr
 Councillor 5: Gérard Berger
 Councillor 6: Gérard Gosselin

Grande-Vallée
Electors: 1 020
Voters: 854 (84%)
Councillors 2 and 5 were elected without opposition.
 Mayor: Gabriel Minville
 Councillor 1: Nathalie Côté
 Councillor 2: Jean-Raymond Minville
 Councillor 3: Carline Minville
 Councillor 4: Rock Lemieux
 Councillor 5: Mario Richard
 Councillor 6: Valère Richard

Grosse-Île
Electors: 425
Voters: 310 (73%)
All councillors were elected without opposition.
 Mayor: Christopher Clark
 Councillor 1: Samantha Goodwin
 Councillor 2: Jane Clarke
 Councillor 3: Tammy L. Clarke
 Councillor 4: Timothy Clark
 Councillor 5: Géraldine Burke
 Councillor 6: Miles Clarke

Hope
All elected without opposition.
 Mayor: Hazen Whittom
 Councillor 1: Alain Morin
 Councillor 2: Claude Roussy
 Councillor 3: Magella Grenier
 Councillor 4: Alain Lebrasseur
 Councillor 5: Viola Leblanc
 Councillor 6: Patricia Delarosbil

Hope Town
All elected without opposition.
 Mayor: Léon Dubé
 Councillor 1: Terrance McRae
 Councillor 2: Joseph Gary Ross
 Councillor 3: Roy Mc Whirter
 Councillor 4: Irène Delarosbil
 Councillor 5: Jason Major
 Councillor 6: Lisa Marie Mac Whirter

La Martre
Electors: 241
Voters: 155 (64%)
All councillors were elected without opposition.
 Mayor: Raymond St-Pierre
 Councillor 1: Edmond Daraîche
 Councillor 2: Mathias Dufresne
 Councillor 3: Denis Tétreault
 Councillor 4: Nancy Fournier
 Councillor 5: Réjean Bergeron
 Councillor 6: Gregory Jean-Baptiste

L'Ascension-de-Patapédia
Electors: 203
Voters: 164 (81%)
Councillors 1, 2, 4, 5 and 6 were elected without opposition.
 Mayor: Rémi Gallant
 Councillor 1: Rachel Moreau
 Councillor 2: Marie-Marthe Chabot
 Councillor 3: Jean-Guy Francoeur
 Councillor 4: Céline Tremblay
 Councillor 5: Marc Couture
 Councillor 6: Omer Litalien

Les Îles-de-la-Madeleine
Electors: 10 109
Voters: 6 099 (60%)
Councillors 1 and 5 were elected without opposition.
 Mayor: Joel Arseneau
 Councillor 1: Gérard Verdier
 Councillor 2: Léon Deraspe
 Councillor 3: Rosaire Arseneau
 Councillor 4: Roger Chevarie
 Councillor 5: Nicolas Arseneau
 Councillor 6: Jonathan Lapierre

Maria
Electors: 1 546
Voters: 1 011 (65%)
All councillors were elected without opposition.
 Mayor: Normand Audet
 Councillor 1: Donald Guité
 Councillor 2: Madeleine Fugère
 Councillor 3: Gaston Chouinard
 Councillor 4: Guy Loubert
 Councillor 5: Benoît Cayouette
 Councillor 6: Georges Fournier

Marsoui
Electors: 319
Voters: 266 (83%)
Councillor 2 was elected without opposition.
 Mayor: Jovette Gasse
 Councillor 1: Ambroise Vallée
 Councillor 2: Réjean Leclerc
 Councillor 3: Lina Fournier
 Councillor 4: Bertrand Gagné
 Councillor 5: Dario Jean
 Councillor 6: Renée Gasse

Matapédia
Electors: 572
Voters: 393 (69%)
All councillors were elected without opposition.
 Mayor: Louis Michaud
 Councillor 1: Jérôme Lambert-Bolduc
 Councillor 2: Nicole Lagacé
 Councillor 3: Luc Lagacé
 Councillor 4: Jocelyne Martin
 Councillor 5: Gérald Gray
 Councillor 6: David Le Blanc

Mont-Saint-Pierre
Mayor and councillors 1, 2, 4, 5 and 6 were elected without opposition.
 Mayor: Robert Coulombe
 Councillor 1: Sébastien Cloutier
 Councillor 2: Bermans Drouin
 Councillor 3: Gilles Dion
 Councillor 4: Marco Pazzi
 Councillor 5: Jeanne-D'Arc Ouellet
 Councillor 6: Francis Ross

Murdochville
Mayor and councillor 4 were elected without opposition.
 Mayor: Roussy Deliska
 Councillor 1: Célyne Gasse Coulombe
 Councillor 2: Kathy Pelletier
 Councillor 3: Gilles Chrétien
 Councillor 4: Richard Francoeur
 Councillor 5: Jean-Pierre Chouinard
 Councillor 6: David Blanchette

New Carlisle
Electors: 1 313
Voters: 805 (61%)
Councillor 2 was elected without opposition.
 Mayor: Cyrus Journeau
 Councillor 1: Francis Moran
 Councillor 2: Nevin Gilker
 Councillor 3: Guy Gallibois
 Councillor 4: Marc Babin
 Councillor 5: Graziella Flowers
 Councillor 6: Ken Garrett

New Richmond
All elected without opposition.
 Mayor: Nicole Appleby
 Councillor 1: Réal Cyr
 Councillor 2: Lucille Roy Duchesneau
 Councillor 3: Alain Henry
 Councillor 4: Robert Levesque
 Councillor 5: Éric Dubé
 Councillor 6: Léonard Leblanc

Nouvelle
Electors: 1 538
Voters: 1 006 (65%)
Councillor 5 was elected without opposition.
 Mayor: Luc Leblanc
 Councillor 1: Sylvain Savoie
 Councillor 2: David Landry
 Councillor 3: Richard Frenette
 Councillor 4: Jean-Eudes Leblanc
 Councillor 5: Jean-René Labillois
 Councillor 6: Yvan St-Pierre

Paspébiac
Electors: 2 883
Voters: 2 004 (70%)
Councillors 2, 5 and 6 were elected without opposition.
 Mayor: Gino Lebrasseur
 Councillor 1: Florian Duchesneau
 Councillor 2: Bernard Pelletier
 Councillor 3: Fernand Chapados
 Councillor 4: Danis Lebrasseur
 Councillor 5: Hébert Huard
 Councillor 6: Émilien Grenier

Percé
Electors: 2 971
Voters: 1 782 (60%)
Councillors 1, 4 and 8 were elected without opposition.
 Mayor: Georges Mamelonet
 Councillor 1: Desneiges Duguay
 Councillor 2: Mario Cloutier
 Councillor 3: Sylvaine Lapointe
 Councillor 4: Danielle Thivierge
 Councillor 5: Denis Cain
 Councillor 6: Normand Bond
 Councillor 7: Anita Collin
 Councillor 8: Alex Dubé

Petite-Vallée
Mayor and councillors 1, 3, 4 and 5 were elected without opposition.
 Mayor: Noël-Marie Clavet
 Councillor 1: Léger Richard
 Councillor 2: Harry Lachance
 Councillor 3: Camille Brousseau
 Councillor 4: Marie-France Brousseau
 Councillor 5: Andréa LeBreux
 Councillor 6: Marie-Claude Richard

Pointe-à-la-Croix
All elected without opposition.
 Mayor: Jean-Paul Audy
 Councillor 1: Gilbert Williamson
 Councillor 2: Catherine-Anne Lavigne
 Councillor 3: Michel Leblanc
 Councillor 4: Christian Lavoie
 Councillor 5: Lucille Vallée-Roy
 Councillor 6: Claude Sénéchal

Port-Daniel–Gascons
Electors: 2 213
Voters: 1 633 (74%)
 Mayor: Henri Grenier
 Councillor 1: Winnifred Hottot
 Councillor 2: Henry Briand
 Councillor 3: Diane Mayer
 Councillor 4: Richard Clavet
 Councillor 5: Juliette Duguay
 Councillor 6: Gilles Daraiche

Ristigouche-Partie-Sud-Est
Electors: 169
Voters: 130 (77%)
All councillors were elected without opposition.
 Mayor: Wayne Nicol
 Councillor 1: Alain Sénéchal
 Councillor 2: Annette Sénéchal
 Councillor 3: Jules Ferland
 Councillor 4: Normand Bourdages
 Councillor 5: Chantal Lebel
 Councillor 6: Muriel Savoie

Rivière-à-Claude
All elected without opposition.
 Mayor: Micheline Bernier
 Councillor 1: Marie-Renée Brisebois
 Councillor 2: Ninon Rioux
 Councillor 3: Sylvie Boucher
 Councillor 4: Julien Rioux
 Councillor 5: Romain Leclerc
 Councillor 6: Nataly Morin

Saint-Alexis-de-Matapédia
All elected without opposition.
 Mayor: Guy Gallant
 Councillor 1: J. André Lévesque
 Councillor 2: Josée Nancy Pitre
 Councillor 3: Réginald Desjardins
 Councillor 4: Patrick Leblanc
 Councillor 5: Thérèse Richard
 Councillor 6: Normand Richard

Saint-Alphonse
All elected without opposition.
 Mayor: Gérard Porlier
 Councillor 1: Rémi Miousse
 Councillor 2: Luc Poirier
 Councillor 3: Julien St-Onge
 Councillor 4: Tommy Cyr
 Councillor 5: Josiane Appleby
 Councillor 6: Rock Pratte

Saint-André-de-Restigouche
All elected without opposition.
 Mayor: Doris Deschênes
 Councillor 1: René Charest
 Councillor 2: Gérard Lapointe
 Councillor 3: Caroline Quirion
 Councillor 4: Michel Deschênes
 Councillor 5: Édith Leblanc
 Councillor 6: Fabien Lord

Sainte-Anne-des-Monts
Electors: 5 476
Voters: 2 709 (49%)
 Mayor: Micheline Pelletier
 Councillor 1: Lucien Blanchette
 Councillor 2: Charles Soucy
 Councillor 3: Éliane Pelletier
 Councillor 4: Yann Barriault
 Councillor 5: Jérémy Servant
 Councillor 6: Yvan Pelletier

Saint-Elzéar
All elected without opposition.
 Mayor: Damien Arsenault
 Councillor 1: Rolande Bujold
 Councillor 2: Charles-Omer Arsenault
 Councillor 3: Lisa Bernatchez
 Councillor 4: Marcel Henry
 Councillor 5: Denis Poirier
 Councillor 6: Raymond Marcoux

Sainte-Madeleine-de-la-Rivière-Madeleine
Electors: 376
Voters: 278 (74%)
Councillors 1 and 5 were elected without opposition.
 Mayor: James Patterson
 Councillor 1: Colette Langlois
 Councillor 2: Claire Boucher
 Councillor 3: Joël Côté
 Councillor 4: Gaétan Michaud
 Councillor 5: Jean-Bernard Synnett
 Councillor 6: Jocelyn Boucher

Sainte-Thérèse-de-Gaspé
Mayor and councillors 2, 4 and 5 were elected without opposition.
 Mayor: Léo Lelièvre
 Councillor 1: Alcide Hautcoeur
 Councillor 2: Réjean Desbois
 Councillor 3: Réal Roussy
 Councillor 4: Roland Vallée
 Councillor 5: Murielle Couture
 Councillor 6: Élodien Lebreux

Saint-François-d'Assise
All elected without opposition.
 Mayor: Ghislain Michaud
 Councillor 1: Roselyne Lebrun
 Councillor 2: Jeannine Gallant
 Councillor 3: Rémi Lagacé
 Councillor 4: Xavier Pelletier
 Councillor 5: Jean-Guy Gallant
 Councillor 6: Martial Pitre

Saint-Godefroi
Electors: 361
Voters: 283 (78%)
Councillor 2 was elected without opposition.
 Mayor: Gérard-Raymond Blais
 Councillor 1: Marie-Lyne Roussy
 Councillor 2: Laurette Grenier
 Councillor 3: Édouard Anglehart
 Councillor 4: Roméo Thériault
 Councillor 5: Philippe Larocque
 Councillor 6: Chantal Castilloux

Saint-Maxime-du-Mont-Louis
All elected without opposition.
 Mayor: Paul-Hébert Bernatchez
 Councillor 1: André O. Robinson
 Councillor 2: Maurice Robinson
 Councillor 3: Stéphane Patenaude
 Councillor 4: Ginette Migneault
 Councillor 5: Laurent Mimeault
 Councillor 6: Renaud Robinson

Saint-Siméon
Mayor and councillors 1, 2, 4, 5 and 6 were elected without opposition.
 Mayor: Jean-Guy Poirier
 Councillor 1: Royal Poirier
 Councillor 2: Denis Gauthier
 Councillor 3: Doris Bélanger
 Councillor 4: Daniel Paquet
 Councillor 5: Dial Lepage
 Councillor 6: André Bujold

Shigawake
Mayor and councillors 2, 5 and 6 were elected without opposition.
 Mayor: Kenneth Duguay
 Councillor 1: Marjorie Mc Rae
 Councillor 2: Raynald Aubut
 Councillor 3: Bert Wylie
 Councillor 4: Denzil Ross
 Councillor 5: Rollande Beebe
 Councillor 6: Ulric Francoeur

2005 Quebec municipal elections
Gaspésie–Îles-de-la-Madeleine